Segment polarity protein dishevelled homolog DVL-3 is a protein that in humans is encoded by the DVL3 gene.

This gene is a member of a multi-gene family which shares strong similarity with the Drosophila dishevelled gene, dsh. The Drosophila dishevelled gene encodes a cytoplasmic phosphoprotein that regulates cell proliferation.

Interactions
DVL3 has been shown to interact with DAB2, DVL1 and PRPF3.

See also
 Dishevelled

References

Further reading